Kesarapalle is a Locality in Vijayawada in Krishna district of the Indian state of Andhra Pradesh. It is located in Gannavaram mandal of Gudivada revenue division.It is major IT hub of vijayawada. Vijayawada IT park Medha located here.The major IT companies like HCL located here. As per the G.O. No. M.S.104 (dated:23-03-2017), Municipal Administration and Urban Development Department, it became a part of Vijayawada metropolitan area.

Transport 
It is located on AH-45. State run APS RTC City Bus services and it is well connected with ,Benz circle, K.r Market, City Bus Port, Ramavarappadu Ring and Gannavaram . The nearest  Railway stations are Gannavaram and Nidamanuru Railway stations. Vijayawada Airport is located here.

References 

Neighbourhoods in Vijayawada